The Church of the Resurrection, located at 119 East 74th Street, Manhattan, New York City, is a parish of the Episcopal Diocese of New York in the Episcopal Church. It is the oldest church structure on the Upper East Side.

The church is Anglo-Catholic in doctrine and style, and has an extensive music program. The services are in traditional language and reflect the Anglican and Western Catholic traditions of liturgy and music. In 2021, it reported 105 members, average attendance of 60, and $124,260 in plate and pledge income.

History
The Church of the Resurrection was founded in 1868 as the Church of the Holy Sepulchre by a group of Episcopalians. An armory for the 7th New York Militia was built nearby, and its chaplain, the Reverend James Tuttle Smith, became the first rector. The building was completed in 1869, and was designed by James Renwick Jr., who had earlier built Grace Church in Manhattan, and went on to design the Smithsonian Institution in Washington D.C., and St. Patrick's Cathedral.

Due to problems and lack of funds, his designs were not completely executed. The Great Rood of 1940 was carved by the Dutch sculptor Joep Nicolas. Since 1920, the Church of the Resurrection has been Anglo-Catholic in worship and doctrine.

Resurrection Episcopal Day School
Resurrection Episcopal Day School is an independent, non-profit Montessori early childhood development school for children 3 years through 6 years of age. Housed in the parish building of the Church of the Resurrection, the school is a short distance from Central Park on the Upper East Side of Manhattan. It provides the following programs:
The Montessori Program
The Arts
Creative Movement and Physical Development
Afternoon Enrichment Program
Afternoon School Activities
Summer Camp

Music programs
Resurrection's musicians offer settings of the Mass, motets, and other music every Sunday and on many feasts, often with a chamber orchestra. The choir is composed of professional singers, who appear on Sundays and major feast-days throughout the season. The hymns sung are drawn from the 1940 Hymnal, the New English Hymnal, and many other sources. Several small orchestras and early music groups present concerts at Resurrection.

Worship services
Solemn Mass is celebrated on Sunday mornings according to the English Missal, with full ceremonial, choir, hymns, and a choral Mass setting. During the summer months a Sung Mass is offered instead of the regular Solemn Mass. It includes hymns and a setting of the Ordinary of the Mass for congregational singing. Low Mass is offered at 8:30 am on Sundays and daily through the week at regularly scheduled times.

Other services vary with the monthly schedule, and notice can be found on the website.

See also

Guild of All Souls
St Magnus-the-Martyr

References

External links
 
 Resurrection Episcopal Day School

Churches in Manhattan
Episcopal church buildings in New York City
Anglo-Catholic church buildings in the United States
Gothic Revival church buildings in New York City
Churches completed in 1869
19th-century Episcopal church buildings
James Renwick Jr. church buildings
Upper East Side
1868 establishments in New York (state)